Aciachne is a genus of Latin American plants in the grass family.

 Species
 Aciachne acicularis Laegaard - Costa Rica, Venezuela (Táchira, Mérida), Colombia, Ecuador, Peru, Bolivia, Argentina (Catamarca)
 Aciachne flagellifera Laegaard - Colombia, Ecuador
 Aciachne pulvinata Benth. - Costa Rica, Venezuela (Mérida), Ecuador, Peru, Bolivia

See also 
 List of Poaceae genera

References 

Pooideae
Poaceae genera